Radomir Putnik  (24 January 1847 – 17 May 1917) was the first Serbian Field Marshal and Chief of the General Staff of the Serbian army in the Balkan Wars and in the First World War. He served in every war in which Serbia fought from 1876 to 1917.

Biography

Family background and early career

The Putnik family was originally from Kosovo, but fled the region to the Habsburg monarchy during the Great Serb Migration of 1690. The family decided to return from exile to the Principality of Serbia, the first modern Serbian polity independent of Ottoman rule in the mid-19th century. Putnik's father, Dimitrije, was a teacher in Kragujevac, and Radomir completed his basic schooling there. He attended the Artillery School (the precursor to what would eventually become the Military Academy) in Belgrade, where he graduated in 1863, placing eighth in his class. Contemporaries describe Putnik as an ascetic, introverted man, and a heavy smoker; however, he also had decided views on professional issues. He proved himself on the battlefield during Serbia's wars against the Ottomans fought between 1876 and 1877. It was a military force under his command that took Gnjilane and Gračanica from the Ottomans in Kosovo, during the closing stages of the second Serbo-Ottoman War (1877–1878. The Serbian troops, under Major Putnik, were obliged to pull back to Merdare in order to meet a stipulation in the general armistice between Russian and the Ottomans. Putnik was noted for being a self-righteous and demanding officer prone to strongly defending his point of view.

Putnik became a professor in the Military Academy, holding that position from 1886 to 1895. In 1889, he was appointed as the Deputy Chief of the General Staff. However, he soon came into conflict with King Milan I, partly for not allowing a protégé of the king to pass an examination. Political intrigue and latent conflict with King Milan Obrenović and his successor, King Alexander I, would hinder his advancement throughout this part of his career. In 1895 he was forced to retire by the king, under suspicion of sympathy for the Radical party of Nikola Pašić.

Rehabilitation under Peter I

Putnik was rehabilitated following the coup d'état against Alexander I Obrenović in 1903. Under the new king of Serbia, Peter I Karadjordjević, he was promoted to the rank of general and appointed as the Chief of the General Staff. He then proceeded to reorganize the Serbian army by retiring old and promoting new officers, and updating outdated war plans. Putnik was Serbian Minister of War three times: 1904, 1906–1908, 1912. Putnik appointed General Živojin Mišić as his deputy. Despite occasional personality clashes, the two men had deep respect for each other. Putnik was the first officer to be appointed to the highest rank of Field Marshal. In 1912, he led the Serbian Army into spectacular victories in the First Balkan War against the Ottomans (Battle of Kumanovo, October 1912, Battle of Monastir, November 1912) and the Second Balkan War against Bulgaria (Battle of Bregalnica 1913). Field-Marshal Putnik, expecting Bulgarian attack, had deployed his troops on the most important strategic points near the river Bregalnica (Bregalnitza), which was essential for a quick victory after the sudden, unannounced Bulgarian attack.

World War I

Caught in Budapest when Austria-Hungary declared war upon his country, Field Marshal Putnik was allowed safe passage back to Serbia in a chivalrous and possibly self-defeating gesture by the Austro-Hungarian emperor Franz Josef. After a troublesome trip, Putnik returned to Serbia and offered his resignation to King Peter I of Serbia on the grounds of age and ill health.  It was rejected, the king insisting that Field Marshal Putnik take command over the army, if only in a strategic sense, while younger generals, such as Stepa Stepanović, Živojin Mišić and Petar Bojović would take over operational duties. Putnik had to spend most of his time in a well-heated room. However, his impaired health did not prevent him from successfully organizing the campaign. Serbia defeated the Austro-Hungarian Army's offensives in August and September 1914 (battles of Cer and Kolubara), driving it out of Serbia by December 1914.

In early 1915, Prince Alexander insisted upon assuming direct command of the army from Putnik. Putnik refused to abide by request, arguing that it was unconstitutional and that a monarch could not assume such a responsibility.

The Serbian front then remained relatively quiet until autumn 1915, when joint Austro-Hungarian, German and Bulgarian forces, led by German Field Marshal August von Mackensen, began a large offensive against Serbia with more than 300,000 soldiers. Before the joint attack, Putnik warned the Serbian government that Bulgaria was concentrating her troops at the eastern Serbian borders and that a preventive attack on Bulgaria was the only chance for Serbia to avoid fighting on two fronts. His demand was rejected due to the wishes of the Allies, who were still hoping to isolate Bulgaria from joining the Triple Alliance. Despite heroic resistance, the Serbian troops were obliged to retreat towards Kosovo. On 31 October, Putnik ordered a general retreat onto Kragujevac, attempting to keep his exhausted army together as it sought to escape into friendly territory. Many of Putnik's soldiers were farmers, who occasionally slipped away from the retiring army to resume their rural lives. Putnik's rapidly declining forces continued their withdrawal towards Albania during the first week of November 1915, a process aided by the fact that the Germans, Bulgarians and Austro-Hungarians were reluctant to pursue Serbian troops through the highlands of Albania. The Germans felt that the war against Serbia was won, with most of the nation under the control of the Central Powers. Regarding the Russian Empire as the main threat in the East, Mackensen was eager to move his forces back to the Russian front. The Bulgarians were satisfied with their territorial gains in Macedonia and southeast Serbia, while the Austro-Hungarians were equally content with the notion that the Bulgarians were not moving to establish a Greater Bulgaria.

The final confrontation occurred in Kosovo, the Field of the Blackbirds, between 19 and 24 November 1915. The Serbs were afflicted by a new outbreak of typhus, while food and ammunition was in extremely short supply. Facing inevitable defeat Putnik made his last and most painful order on 25 November — full retreat, southwards and westwards through Montenegro and into Albania. His goal was to reach allied ships that would, he hoped, transport the core of the army to the safety of the Ionian islands. Many of the fleeing soldiers and civilians died during the retreat to the coast –  lost to hunger, disease, attacks by enemy forces and Albanian tribal bands. The circumstances of the retreat were disastrous, and all told, some 155,000 Serbs, out of 250,000 mostly soldiers, eventually reached the coast of the Adriatic Sea, and embarked on Allied transport ships that carried the army to various Greek islands (many to Corfu) before being deployed at the Salonika front in April 1916. In worsening health, Putnik had to be carried in a sedan chair during the retreat through snowy mountains of Albania, exhausted by the effort and episodes of bronchitis, influenza and pneumonia. Putnik was met by allied forces in Scutari (Skadar) and transported first to Brindisi and then to Corfu, along with the core of the army.

Dismissal and death
In the atmosphere of recrimination that followed between the Serbian Government and the High Command, the entire General Staff was dismissed in January 1916, including Field Marshal Putnik. He felt embittered, having learned of his dismissal from a cashier who gave him his salary without a Chief of General Staff's supplement. He traveled to Nice, where the French authorities welcomed him with honors and gave him a villa. Putnik was overcome by lung emphysema and died on 17 May 1917 without seeing his homeland again. His remains were transferred to Serbia in November 1926 and buried with honors in a chapel at Belgrade's New Cemetery. The grave carries the epitaph "Grateful Homeland to Radomir Putnik".

Legacy
Mount Putnik in Alberta, Canada was named after him in 1918 for his exceptional services to the allied cause. He is included in The 100 most prominent Serbs.

Military career

Commander of 3rd Mountain Battery, January 1867
Commander of Čačak Battery of People's Army, October 1868
Commander of 4th Mountain Battery, April 1867
Commander of Merzetska Battery, February 1871
Duties at Artillery inspection, October 1872
Duties at Department of the Artillery, January 1874
Chief of Artillery Factory at Kragujevac, 1875
Adjutant I class of Rudnik Brigade, April 1876
Chief of staff of Rudnik Brigade, June 1876
Commander of Rudnik Brigade, 1876
Commander of Vranje Military District, 1878
Duties at Artillery Department of Ministry of the Military, 1879
Chief of staff of Division of standing army, 1880
Commander of Toplica Military District, April 1881
Duties at Artillery Department of Ministry of the Military, March 1883
Chief of staff of Danube Division, September 1883
Chief of Foreign Intelligence Department of Operational Department of Main General Staff, 1886
Chief of Operational Department of Main General Staff, April 1888
Deputy Chief of Main General Staff, 1890
President of examination committee for a rank of major, March 1893
Commander of Šumadija Division, June 1893
President of examination committee for a rank of major, April 1894
Deputy Chairman of the Military Court of Cassation, January 1895
Retired on 26 October 1896
Chief of General Staff, 1903

Awards and decorations

Quotes
 
Ironic remark in a letter to Andra Knićanin on the movements of the Serbian army across very difficult terrain at the beginning of the Serbo-Turkish war of 1878.

Upon first hearing of the Battle of Kumanovo – The Serbian High Command expected that a decisive battle with the Ottoman forces has yet to take place – most likely on Ovče Polje plateau just north of Skopje. Also, due to communication problems, it first heard of the battle when it had already been won.

See also
 Petar Bojović
 Živojin Mišić
 Stepa Stepanović
 Božidar Janković
 Ilija Gojković
 Pavle Jurišić Šturm
 Ivan S. Pavlović

References

Sources

External links

1847 births
1917 deaths
Military personnel from Kragujevac
People from the Principality of Serbia
Field marshals
Serbian soldiers
People of the Serbo-Bulgarian War
Serbian military personnel of World War I
Serbian military personnel of the Balkan Wars
Chiefs of the Serbian General Staff
Recipients of the Order of the Cross of Takovo
Grand Crosses of the Order of St. Sava
Recipients of the Medal for Bravery (Serbia)
Honorary Knights Commander of the Order of St Michael and St George
Recipients of the Order of the Crown (Romania)
Grand Officers of the Order of the Crown (Romania)
Recipients of the Order of Military Merit (Bulgaria)
Recipients of the Order of Saint Stanislaus (Russian), 1st class
Grand Officiers of the Légion d'honneur
Royal Serbian Army soldiers
Defence ministers of Serbia